Central High School is a public high school in the Logan section of Philadelphia, Pennsylvania.  Central, the second-oldest continuously used public high school in the United States, was founded in 1836 and is a four-year university preparatory magnet school.

About 2,400 students attend grades 9 through 12. It consistently ranks among the top schools in the city and state. Central is regarded as one of the top public schools in the nation due to its high academic standards. This school requires exceptional grades for enrollment.

Central High School is the only high school in the United States with authority, granted by an Act of Assembly in 1849, to confer academic degrees upon its graduates. This practice is still in effect, and graduates who meet the requirements are granted the Bachelor of Arts degree. Central also confers high school diplomas upon graduates who do not meet a bachelor's degree requirement.

Due to its authority to grant academic degrees, Central traditionally refers to the principal of the school as the "President" of Central High School. The current incoming President is Katharine Davis, the school’s first woman and person of color to hold the position.

Central, rather than using a general class year to identify its classes (as in "class of 2022"), uses the class graduating number system (as in "280th" graduating class" or "280"). This tradition started shortly after the school's founding when it was common to have two graduating classes per year – one in January and one in June. In June 1965, semiannual graduations were replaced by annual graduations. As of the 2022-2023
school year, the current senior class is 282.

History

Central High School of Philadelphia was founded in 1836 as "the crowning glory" of Philadelphia's public school system, "the worthy apex to a noble pyramid", and the first "high" school in the state. Because city voters only reluctantly had been convinced of the need for a high school, the curriculum was carefully and publicly geared to the needs of taxpayers. Central's founders made an especially concerted effort to avoid educating students in the manner of private academies of the day, where classical languages and literature were of paramount importance.

Central High School is the second oldest continuously public high school in the United States. The school was chartered by an Act of Assembly and approved on June 13, 1836. A site was purchased on the east side of Juniper Street below Market Street, and the cornerstone was laid on September 19, 1837. The school opened on October 21, 1838, with four professors and sixty-three students.

In November 1839, Alexander Dallas Bache, great-grandson of Benjamin Franklin, and Professor of Natural Philosophy and Chemistry at the University of Pennsylvania, was elected the first President of Central High School. President Bache resigned in 1842 to return to his professorship at the University of Pennsylvania, and was succeeded by John Seely Hart, who had been a Professor of Languages at Princeton University.

In 1845, two distinguished English members of the Society of Friends, James H. Tuke and Joseph Corosfield, spent several months in America investigating the school system of the United States. They devoted more than one-third of the text of their report to Central High School, which they depicted as a type of institution that had helped America and could help England.

An Act of Assembly approved on April 9, 1849, provided that:

"The Controllers of the Public Schools of the First School District of Pennsylvania shall have and possess power to confer academic degrees in the arts upon graduates of the Central High School, in the City of Philadelphia, and the same and like power to confer degrees, honorary and otherwise, which is now possessed by the University of Pennsylvania." In accordance with this Act, the Board of Controllers on September 11, 1849, authorized the conferring of appropriate degrees upon graduates of Central High.

On June 24, 1847, the President of the United States, James K. Polk, with Vice-President George M. Dallas and Attorney General Nathan Clifford, paid a visit to the school and addressed the students.

In September 1854, the school transferred to a new building, located at the southeast corner of Broad and Green Streets. In 1858, President Hart resigned and was succeeded by Nicholas Harper Maguire. In September 1900, the school moved to its third location in a newer and larger building located at Broad, Green, Fifteenth, and Brandywine Streets. During the formal dedication on November 22, 1902, Theodore Roosevelt, President of the United States, addressed the students.

In 1939, Central moved from Broad and Green to its fourth, current location at Ogontz and Olney Avenues. The building left behind became the Benjamin Franklin High School.

After 139 years of existence as an all-male public high school, Central's all-male policy was challenged by Susan Vorchheimer, who wished to be admitted to Central. On August 7, 1975, U.S. District Court Judge Clarence C. Newcomer ruled that Central must admit academically qualified girls starting in the fall term of 1975. The decision was appealed, and the Third Circuit Court ruled that Central had the right to retain its present status. The case eventually reached the U.S. Supreme Court that, on April 19, 1977, upheld the Third Circuit Court's verdict by a 4 to 4 vote with one abstention. That Supreme Court case was called Vorchheimer v. School Dist. of Philadelphia.

In August 1983, Judge William M. Marutani of the Philadelphia County Court of Common Pleas, ruled that the single-sex admission policy was unconstitutional. The Board of Education voted not to appeal the legal decision, thereby admitting girls to Central High School. In September 1983, the first six girls, all seniors, were admitted.

In October 1987, and again in September 2011, Central High School was officially named a Secondary school of National Excellence by the United States Department of Education and named a Blue Ribbon School. In March 1992, Redbook magazine named Central one of the best schools in Pennsylvania. Central was named "Best Secondary School in Pennsylvania" by the magazine each year since they began rating the nation's best schools.

The multimillion-dollar art, science, and physical education addition was officially dedicated on February 17, 1994.

The Barnwell library is now one of the most advanced public school libraries in the United States since the $12 million renovation completed in 2005.

In 2013, Central High School's score on the Pennsylvania school performance profile was 101.3 out of a possible 100 non-bonus point score. This ranked them as the number two public high school in the state, the other being the Downingtown STEM Academy with a rating of 101.4 out of 100 non-bonus point score.

Philadelphia School of Pedagogy
The Philadelphia School of Pedagogy was a program for Central graduates who wanted to become elementary school teachers. It was the male counterpart to the Philadelphia's normal school, originally the upper-division of Philadelphia High School for Girls.

Once a Bachelor's degree became the standard qualification for teachers, the normal schools that were run by the State System of Higher Education became colleges (e.g., West Chester, Cheyney, Indiana, etc.). However, the Philadelphia schools were run by the School District of Philadelphia, who had less money, and were located only a few blocks from Temple University.

Presidents of Central High School

 Alexander Dallas Bache – 1839–1842
 John Seely Hart – 1842–1858
 Nicholas Harper Maguire. – 1858–1866
 George Inman Riché – 1866–1886 (19th Class)
 Franklin Taylor – 1886–1888
 Henry Clark Johnson – 1888–1893
 Robert Ellis Thompson – 1894–1920
 John Louis Haney – 1920–1943 (100th Class)
 William Hafner Cornog – 1943–1955 (146th Class)
 Elmer Field – 1955–1962 (122nd Class)
 William H. Gregory – 1962–1969
 Howard Carlisle – 1969–1983 (162nd Class)
 Sheldon S. Pavel – 1984–2012
 Timothy J. McKenna – 2012–2022
 Katharine S. Davis – 2022–present (264th Class)

Guide to class numbers
Since graduates are usually identified by class number, the year they graduated is not immediately apparent.  This section explains the relation between class number and graduation date.

The first class graduated in June 1842. Through much of the school's history, there were two graduating classes per year, in January and June.  However, there was only one graduating class in June in some years, including all years after 1965.  The following list details the correspondence between class number and graduation date.

  1 June 1842
  2 June 1843
  3 January 1844
  4 June 1844
… 2 classes per year …
 75 January 1880
 76 June 1880
 77 June 1881
 78 June 1882
 79 January 1883
… 2 classes per year …
 95 January 1891
 96 June 1891
 97 June 1892
… 1 class per year …
116 June 1911
117 January 1912
118 June 1912
… 2 classes per year …
223 January 1965
224 June 1965
225 June 1966
… 1 class per year …

Thus, for classes graduating after 1965, if one knows the class number, one can determine the year of graduation by adding 1741. Conversely, if one knows the graduation year, one can determine the class number by subtracting 1741.

Notable alumni

References

External links

 Current Central High School Web site
 Historical Central High School Web sites (from the Wayback Machine):
 September 4, 2010 thru March 21, 2011
 November 19, 2000 thru August 13, 2010
 October 9, 1999 thru February 6, 2001
 April 11, 1997 thru April 20, 1999
 The School District of Philadelphia

Educational institutions established in 1836
High schools in Philadelphia
Magnet schools in Pennsylvania
School District of Philadelphia
School buildings on the National Register of Historic Places in Philadelphia
Public high schools in Pennsylvania
History of Philadelphia
1836 establishments in Pennsylvania
Logan, Philadelphia